Zhan Garden (literally "Garden of Forward Watching") is a Chinese garden located on No. 128 Zhan Yuan Road, beside Fuzimiao, Nanjing, Jiangsu, China.

The first garden on this site was built during the early Ming dynasty by the general Xu Da. It was destroyed during the Taiping Rebellion in the Qing dynasty, but was rebuilt later. As the main residence of Kiangsu Provincial Governor in the late Qing dynasty, it was visited by the Qianlong Emperor and was restored after 1949, with the southern 'mountain' added in 1960.

On the grounds is the Taiping Heavenly Kingdom History Museum.

Gallery

See also
List of Chinese gardens

References

Gardens in China
Buildings and structures in Nanjing
Tourist attractions in Nanjing
Parks in Nanjing
Major National Historical and Cultural Sites in Jiangsu